"Sun Goes Down" is a song by German DJ and record producer Robin Schulz. It features the vocals from British singer Jasmine Thompson. The song was released in Germany as a digital download on 24 October 2014. The song peaked at number two on the German Singles Chart.

It served as the official song of the 2015 CONCACAF Gold Cup.

The song's composition consists of a piano, and a saxophone drop, accompanied by Schulz's beats, and Thompson's vocals. At the beginning of the song, the vocals and the drop, a loud, horn-like sound effect is played.

Music video
The accompanying music video for "Sun Goes Down" was made in September 2014 by director Lilja and shows various protagonists in different places all over Europe. The video is a collage of intimate everyday moments that couldn’t be more different. However, one thing that they all share is the moment in which time seems to stand still and let the world take a deep breath.

Filmed in four locations around Europe, the video features actress and model Milla Puolakanaho in Turku, Finland, a group of friends around cinematographer Karol Łakomiec and singer Kasia Zielińska on a rooftop in Warsaw, Poland, terra-cotta artist Dino Daddiego in the old town of Sassi di Matera, Italy, as well as both artists of the song, Robin Schulz and Jasmine Thompson in London, England. The gathering of Jasmine Thompson and her friends was shot in Burgess Park in Southwark, the DJ set with Robin Schulz was shot during a regular gig of his at the club EGG LDN.

The aerials were filmed by Markus Gelhard of Zebraworkz on location in Turku and Matera.

The total length of the video is two minutes and fifty-four seconds. The video was released on 1 October 2014 on Robin Schulz’s YouTube channel and has received more than 750 million views as of September 2022.

Formats and track listings

Charts

Weekly charts

Year-end charts

Certifications

Release history

References

2014 songs
2014 singles
Robin Schulz songs
Jasmine Thompson songs
2015 CONCACAF Gold Cup
CONCACAF Gold Cup official songs and anthems
Tropical house songs
Songs written by Robin Schulz
Songs written by Tom Cane